Metriorhynchidae is an extinct family of specialized, aquatic metriorhynchoid crocodyliforms from the Middle Jurassic to the Early Cretaceous period (Bajocian to early Aptian) of Europe, North America and South America. The name Metriorhynchidae was coined by the Austrian zoologist Leopold Fitzinger in 1843. The group contains two subfamilies, the Metriorhynchinae and the Geosaurinae. They represent the most marine adapted of all archosaurs.

Description
Metriorhynchids are fully aquatic crocodyliforms. Their forelimbs were small and paddle-like, and unlike living crocodylians, they lost their osteoderms ("armour scutes"). Their body shape maximised hydrodynamy (swimming efficiency), as they did have a shark-like tail fluke. Like ichthyosaurs and plesiosaurs, metriorhynchids developed smooth, scaleless skin.

Metriorhynchids were the only group of archosaurs to become fully adapted to the marine realm, becoming pelagic in lifestyle. With tail flukes, reduced limb musculature, and long bones histologically comparable to other obligately aquatic animals, they were almost certainly incapable of terrestrial locomotion; combined with an unusually tall hip opening, as also seen in other obligately aquatic reptiles including the viviparous Keichousaurus, these characters suggest that metriorhynchids gave live birth. A fossil of a pregnant Dakosaurus female recovered from the Late Jurassic Plattenkalk, Bavaria, preserves the complete skeleton of a neonate with small, paddle-like forelimbs unsuited for walking on land, similar to those of adults, further supporting live birth in metriorhynchids. Recent research posits that despite their successful adaptation to a pelagic lifestyle, basal metriorhynchids were uniquely disadvantaged among aquatic tetrapods in evolving into sustained swimmers due to little to no posterodorsal retraction of the external nares (unlike other reptilian groups such as mesosaurs, phytosaurs, thalattosaurians, saurosphargids, ichthyosauriforms, sauropterygians, pleurosaurids or mosasauroids, as well as mammalian cetaceans or sirenians). The family has a wide geographic distribution, with material found in Argentina, Chile, Cuba, England, France, Germany, Italy, Mexico, Poland, Russia, Switzerland and Czech Republic.

Classification
Phylogenetic analyses published during the 2000s cast doubt on the idea that many traditional metriorhynchid genera formed natural groups (i.e., include all descendants of a common ancestor). The traditional species of Geosaurus, Dakosaurus and Cricosaurus were found to represent unnatural groups, and the species traditionally classified in these genera were reshuffled in a study published in November 2009 by Mark T. Young and Marco Brandalise de Andrade. The monophyly of Metriorhynchus  and Teleidosaurus is also unsupported, and the species of these genera are pending reclassification.

The classification presented by Young and Andrade in 2009 was approved in later studies of the Metriorhynchidae. Metriorhynchidae is a node-based taxon defined in 2009 as the least inclusive clade consisting of Metriorhynchus geoffroyii and Geosaurus giganteus. The cladogram below follows the topology from the 2020 analyses by Young et al. and reduced to genera only.

List of genera
The type genus of the family Metriorhynchidae is Metriorhynchus from the Middle to Late Jurassic. Other genera included within this family are Cricosaurus, Geosaurus, and Dakosaurus. Though once considered a metriorhynchid, Teleidosaurus has since been found to be slightly more distantly related to these animals within the superfamily Metriorhynchoidea.

Within this family, the genus Neustosaurus and Enaliosuchus are considered nomen dubium ("doubtful name").

The genus Capelliniosuchus was once thought to be a metriorhynchid similar to Dakosaurus. However, it was later found to be a mosasaur.

See also

List of marine reptiles

References

Middle Jurassic crocodylomorphs
Early Cretaceous crocodylomorphs
Prehistoric reptile families
Prehistoric marine crocodylomorphs
Middle Jurassic first appearances
Early Cretaceous extinctions
Late Jurassic crocodylomorphs